Stornoway is a special service area within the Rural Municipality of Wallace No. 243. In 2006 the community had a population of 10 people. It previously held the status of village until December 31, 2006. The community is located east of the City of Yorkton 10 km north of highway 10. The Community was founded in the late 1890s by Robert MacKay of Stornoway, Scotland.

See also 
List of communities in Saskatchewan
List of hamlets in Saskatchewan

References 

Former villages in Saskatchewan
Special service areas in Saskatchewan
Wallace No. 243, Saskatchewan
Populated places disestablished in 2006
Division No. 9, Saskatchewan